Dame Muriel Betty Powell, DBE (30 October 1914 – 8 December 1978), was a British nurse, hospital matron, nurse educator, public servant, and Chief Nursing Officer (CNO) for the Scottish Home and Health Department (SHHD) 1970-76.

Early life 
Powell was born , lived and was educated in Cinderford, Forest of Dean, Gloucestershire. She was the fourth of seven children of Annie (nee Stewart) and Wallace George Powell, a stonemason who set up a house building company. The family were committed  members of the local Anglican church , where the vicar had previously been a chaplain at London at the Middlesex Hospital and St. George's Hospital, when it was at Hyde Park Corner. Powell had decided to train as a nurse with a view to becoming a missionary in Africa and applied to St. George's Hospital , Hyde Park Corner , London on the advice of her vicar, the Reverend Gliddon.

Early Nursing Career 
Powell entered trained at St. George's Hospital , London in 1934 and qualified as a State Registered Nurse in 1936. She then undertook midwifery training at St. George's Hospital , London and in Gloucestershire , attaining her Registered Midwife qualification from the Central Midwives Board in mid-1939. She first worked at the emergency maternity hospital at Potslip Hall, Gloucestershire and ,on its closure, as a district nurse/midwife for a short time.  Returning to London in 1940  she gained her Nurse Tutor Certificate from Battersea College of Technology(1941) and Diploma in Nursing from University of London(1942).  Powell was appointed sister tutor at  Ipswich Borough General Hospital in 1943 and principal tutor at Manchester Royal Infirmary in1946. She joined the Royal College of Nursing in 1934.

Later Nursing Career 

In 1947, aged 32, Powell became matron at St George's Hospital, London. Her age reportedly "raised eyebrows" among the medical establishment, which deemed her too young for the position, but she proved her critics wrong and would remain there for 22 years. Powell was part of the government committee that recommended removal of the title "matron" from the National Health Service in 1968. The title has since been gradually reintroduced to the NHS lexicon.

She was appointed Chief Nursing Officer in Scotland in 1970.  However, it soon became clear that she suffered from dementia, and retired in 1976.  She returned to Gloucestershire, where she died in a psychiatric hospital in 1978, aged 64.

Honours and awards 
Muriel Powell was appointed In the Queen's Honors' list ,first, as a Commander of the British Empire (CBE) in 1962 and then as a Dame (DBE) in 1968 for her services to nursing, and specifically her membership of the Salmon Committee and including her tenure as matron of St George's Hospital, London.

Legacy
The St George's Nurses League presents the Dame Muriel Powell Award to those who have made important contributions in the field of nursing.

References

Sources
Thurgood, G. "Muriel Powell Remembered. A Profile of her Life", Journal of Nursing Management (July 2001)
Scott, Elizabeth J. C. "Dame Muriel Powell (1914-1978): role model of a hospital matron and leader of nursing". Journal of Medical Biography, Royal Society of Medicine publication;  (as per the NCBI).

External links
 Famous nurses: Dame Muriel Powell Profile

1914 births
1978 deaths
NHS Chief Professional Officers
Civil servants in the Scottish Office
Nurses from London
British nursing administrators
Dames Commander of the Order of the British Empire
Place of death missing
People educated at East Dean Grammar School
People in health professions from Edinburgh